FC Dinamo Minsk (FK Dynama Minsk) is a professional football club based in the Belarusian capital city of Minsk.

It was founded in 1927 as part of the Soviet Dinamo Sports Society, and was the only club from the Byelorussian SSR that competed in the Soviet Top League, playing 39 of the 54 seasons, and winning the title in 1982. Since the independence of Belarus, the club participates in the Belarusian Premier League, having won 7 league titles and 3 Belarusian Cups.

Dinamo plays its home games in the 22,246 capacity Dinamo Stadium in Minsk. Dinamo is the second Belarusian team, after BATE Borisov to reach UEFA Europa League group stages (2014–15 and 2015–16).

History

Soviet Union 

Dinamo Minsk was founded in 1927 as a part of the Soviet Dinamo Sports Society. They spent some of their history in the lower leagues of the Soviet Union, but in 1940, they were promoted to the Soviet Top League, becoming the first and only Belarusian team to compete in the Soviet top division. They were relegated to the second level in 1952, but returned to the top level the next year. In 1954, they finished in the third place, their best performance in the top flight to date, and were dissolved, being re-founded as Spartak Minsk, only to be renamed in Belarus Minsk in 1959, in honor of the Soviet republic in the national championship. However, in 1962, they return to the original name of Dinamo Minsk. They were relegated again from top level in 1955 and in 1957. They played in the top level again in the 1960 season. They were relegated again in 1973 and returned to the top level in the 1975 season. But they relegated immediately in 1976. They returned top level after 2 years.

In 1982, Dinamo Minsk won the Soviet championship for the first and only time in their history. The following year saw them debuting in the European Cup against Grasshopper of Switzerland. They reached the quarter-finals of the European Cup after eliminating Grasshoppers and Győri ETO of Hungary, only to be eliminated by Dinamo București. In the 1984–85 season, Dinamo Minsk reached the quarter-finals of the UEFA Cup after beating HJK Helsinki, Sporting CP and Widzew Łódź, but were eventually stopped by Željezničar Sarajevo. 1988 saw Dinamo Minsk up to a new European performance, the quarter-finals of the UEFA Cup Winners' Cup, passing through Gençlerbirliği and Real Sociedad, but being eliminated by Mechelen.

Dinamo Minsk also participated in Belarusian SSR league. Since the mid-50s, their appearances were only sporadic and they were represented by youth teams in later seasons. They have won the championship 7 times.

Belarus 
Dinamo Minsk won the inaugural season of the Belarusian Premier League in 1992. They won 5 league titles until 1995, making only one appearance in the UEFA Champions League, in 1993. However, after a title in 1997, Dinamo Minsk last won the championship in 2004. The 2000s saw Dinamo Minsk failing to secure any league title in the battle against BATE Borisov, thus finishing in lower places.

In 2014, Dinamo Minsk beat MYPA, CFR Cluj and Nacional to be drawn in Group K of UEFA Europa League, along with Italian side Fiorentina, French team Guingamp and Greek side PAOK, becoming the second team, after BATE Borisov, to reach group stages of Europa League. Dinamo finished at the bottom with four points, after a draw with Guingamp and a historical 2–1 victory over Fiorentina.

Name history 
 1927, club founded as Dinamo Minsk as part of Dynamo sports society
 1954, re-branded as Spartak Minsk being transferred to Spartak volunteer sports society
 1959, formed to Belarus Minsk based on better teams of the 1959 Class B Spartak Minsk and Urozhai Minsk
 1962, renamed to Dinamo Minsk being transferred back to Dynamo sports society

Supporters and Rivalries 

The ultras of Dinamo Minsk are famous for their right-wing political orientation and there have been several riots, clashes with the police forces and chants against the Belarusian authoritarian regime, led by long-time President Alexander Lukashenko.

Their political views as well as geographic proximity and contest for dominance of the city make them rivals with neighbours Partizan Minsk, whose fans tend to be strongly left-wing. Dinamo Minsk also has a big rivalry with BATE Borisov from the city of Barysaw.

Honours 

 Belarus

Belarusian Premier League
Winners (7): 1992, 1992–93, 1993–94, 1994–95, 1995, 1997, 2004
Runners-up: 1996, 2001, 2005, 2006, 2008, 2009, 2014, 2015, 2017
3rd place: 2000, 2003, 2012, 2013, 2016, 2018, 2021
Belarusian Cup
Winners (3): 1992, 1993–94, 2002–03
Runners-up: 1995–96, 1997–98, 2012–13
Season Cup
Winners: 1994
 Soviet Union

Soviet Top League
Winners: 1982
3rd place: 1954, 1963, 1983
Soviet Cup
Runners-up: 1965, 1987
Federation Cup
Runners-up: 1989
Soviet First League:
Winners: 1953, 1956
Runners-up: 1951, 1975
3rd place: 1974, 1978

Football Championship of the Belarusian SSR
Winners (6): 1937, 1938, 1939, 1945, 1951, 1975
Runners-up: 1934, 1935, 1946, 1952, 1977
3rd place:1940, 1947

Current squad 
As of March 2023

Coaching staff

Reserves 

There has been several teams that served as Dinamo Minsk official reserve or farm clubs.

Dinamo-d Minsk was the club's reserve team which competed in the Soviet Top League (or First League) Reserves championship. In 1992 this reserve team was transformed into Dinamo-2 Minsk, which eventually got promoted to Belarusian Premier League and split into new club Belarus Minsk (later renamed to more commonly known Dinamo-93 Minsk). This club disbanded in 1998.
Dinamo-Juni Minsk was formed as an outfit for young Dinamo players in 1993 and played in Second League and First League from the 1993–94 season until the end of 2004. 
New Dinamo-2 Minsk was formed 2000. They were active in the Second League during 2000–2002 and again in 2011–2012.
Bereza-2010 was originally an independent club, which since 2010 formed a partnership with Dinamo, serving as their farm club until the dissolution in late 2015.
Since 2001 Dinamo is represented by a reserve team in Belarusian Premier League Reserves Championship.

Notable managers 
 Eduard Malofeyev (1978–83): USSR Championship 1982
 Mikhail Vergeyenko (1991–94): Belarusian Championship 1992, 1992–93, 1993–94
 Anatoly Baidachny (1997): Belarusian Championship 1997
 Yuri Shukanov (2004–05): Belarusian Championship 2004

League history 
 Belarus

European record 

Accurate as of 14 July 2022

Legend: GF = Goals For. GA = Goals Against. GD = Goal Difference.

References

External links 

Official Website 
Supporter Guestbook
Dinamo Minsk at UEFA.COM
Dinamo Minsk at EUFO.DE
Dinamo Minsk at Weltfussball.de
Dinamo Minsk at Weltfussballarchiv.com
Dinamo Minsk at National Football Teams.com
Dinamo Minsk at Football-Lineups.com

 
Football clubs in Belarus
Football clubs in Minsk
Minsk
1927 establishments in Belarus
Association football clubs established in 1927
Soviet Top League clubs
Dinamo Minsk